Scoparia tetracycla is a species of moth in the family Crambidae. It is endemic in New Zealand.

Taxonomy

This species was named by Edward Meyrick in 1884. Meyrick gave a description of the species in 1885. However the placement of this species within the genus Scoparia is in doubt. As a result, this species has also been referred to as Scoparia (s.l.) tetracycla.

Description

The wingspan is about 25 mm. The forewings are ochreous-grey, irrorated with whitish. The lines are whitish and black-margined. The hindwings are pale fuscous-grey, with a darker hindmargin. Adults have been recorded on wing in March.

References

Moths described in 1884
Moths of New Zealand
Scorparia
Endemic fauna of New Zealand
Taxa named by Edward Meyrick
Endemic moths of New Zealand